James H. Pruitt (December 16, 1917 – July 19, 2002) was a one-term mayor of Eau Gallie, Florida from 1956 to 1957, and member of the Florida House of Representatives from 1959 to 1967, in which he served office with Jim Dressler.

In 1954, he founded Pruitt Real Estate.

Legacy 
 In 2004, the Florida Legislature dedicated the bridge which spans the Sebastian Inlet, connecting Indian River County to Brevard County the James H. Pruitt Memorial Bridge

See also 
 List of members of the Florida House of Representatives from Brevard County, Florida

References 

1917 births
2002 deaths
Democratic Party members of the Florida House of Representatives
Businesspeople from Georgia (U.S. state)
American real estate brokers
20th-century American politicians
Businesspeople from Florida
20th-century American businesspeople
People from Eau Gallie, Florida